Gausdal is a municipality in Innlandet county, Norway. It is located in the traditional district of Gudbrandsdal. The administrative centre of the municipality is the village of Segalstad bru. Other villages in Gausdal include Follebu, Forset, and Svingvoll.

The  municipality is the 91st largest by area out of the 356 municipalities in Norway. Gausdal is the 157th most populous municipality in Norway with a population of 6,079.

Logging, farming, and tourism are important industries in the municipality.

General information
The parish of Gausdal was established as a civil municipality on 1 January 1838 (see formannskapsdistrikt law). On 1 January 1867, a small area of neighboring Øyer Municipality (population: 40) was transferred into Gausdal. In 1879, the municipality of Gausdal was divided into two separate municipalities: Vestre Gausdal in the northwest (population: 2,362) and Østre Gausdal in the southeast (population: 5,911). On 27 July 1956, a small area of Sør-Fron municipality (population: 7) was transferred to the neighboring municipality of Vestre Gausdal. During the 1960s, there were many municipal mergers across Norway due to the work of the Schei Committee. On 1 January 1962, the two municipalities of Vestre Gausdal (population: 2,590) and Østre Gausdal (population: 3,942) were merged into a new Gausdal Municipality.

Name
The municipality (and parish) were named after the valley in which it is located. The first element comes from the river Gausa which flows through the valley and the last element is dalr which means "valley" or "dale". The river name is derived from the verb  which means "stream forcefully".

Coat of arms

The coat of arms was granted on 19 September 1986. The official blazon is "Per fess azure and argent, a single stair step section slanting outwards". This means the arms have a field (background) that is divided horizontally in the shape of a stair step that is slanting to the right. The field has a tincture of blue on the top part and argent on the bottom part. Argent means it is colored white most of the time, but if it is made out of metal, then silver is used. The arms were designed to mimic the shape of one of the main mountains in the municipality, Skeikampen. The bottom argent part represents the snowy mountain and the top blue part represents the sky. The arms were designed by Inger Line Thallaug.

Churches
The Church of Norway has five parishes within the municipality of Gausdal. It is part of the Sør-Gudbrandsdal prosti (deanery) in the Diocese of Hamar.

History

The old Follebu Church was built of stone in the early Middle Ages (around 1250). It is unusual in that the chancel and nave were built as one continuous piece.

In the 1880s, there was mining for nickel in the Espedalen valley in the northwest part of the municipality. The search for nickel was taken up again in 2004 by Blackstone Venture, a Canadian company.  As of 2006, they are still drilling for mineral samples only.

Geography

Gausdal is bordered on the northwest by Sør-Fron Municipality, on the northeast by Ringebu Municipality and Øyer Municipality, on the southeast by Lillehammer Municipality, on the south by Nordre Land Municipality, and on the southwest by Nord-Aurdal Municipality and Øystre Slidre Municipality.

The famous Peer Gynt mountain road begins here and leads to the town of Vinstra.

A popular ski area is located on the south slope of Skeikampen mountain.

Western tributaries of the Gudbrandsdalslågen river include the Gausa River, which flows through Gausdalen valley. The lake Dokkfløyvatn is located in the municipality.

Norway's smallest national park, Ormtjernkampen National Park, lies within the municipality.

Government
All municipalities in Norway, including Gausdal, are responsible for primary education (through 10th grade), outpatient health services, senior citizen services, unemployment and other social services, zoning, economic development, and municipal roads.  The municipality is governed by a municipal council of elected representatives, which in turn elects a mayor.  The municipality falls under the Vestre Innlandet District Court and the Eidsivating Court of Appeal.

Municipal council
The municipal council  of Gausdal is made up of 23 representatives that are elected to four year terms.  The party breakdown of the council is as follows:

Mayors
The mayors of Gausdal (incomplete list):
1962-1970: Reidar Engjom (Ap)
1970-1975: Bjørn Midtlien (Ap)
1976-1982: Kristian Baukhol (Ap)
1983-1991: Nils Nygard (Ap)
1992-1993: Liv Røe Johnsen (SV)
1994–2001: Inger Enger (Sp)
2001-2007: Olav Olstad (Sp)
2007-2011: Mona B. Nicolaysen (Sp)
2011-2019: Hans Oddvar Høistad (Ap)
2019–present: Anette Musdalslien (Sp)

Notable residents

Public service 
 Abraham Pihl (1756 in Gausdal – 1821) a Norwegian clergyman, astronomer and architect
 Hakon Adelsteen Sommerfeldt (1811 in Gausdal – 1888) a Norwegian naval officer and ship designer
 Sigurd Fougner (1879 in Østre Gausdal – 1959) a Norwegian Supreme Court judge
 Reidar Engjom, (Norwegian Wiki) (1907 - Gausdal - 1970) a Norwegian politician

The Arts 

 Simen Fougner (1701 in Follebu – 1783) a Norwegian farmer, poet and non-fiction writer
 Bjørnstjerne Bjørnson (1832–1910) a Norwegian author and Nobel Prize in Literature winner in 1903; lived in Aulestad in Follebu, 1874-1910
 Iver Holter (1850 in Gausdal – 1941) a composer and conductor of the Bergen Philharmonic Orchestra 1882-1886
 Ole Amundsen Buslett (1855 in Gausdal – 1924) Norwegian-American author, newspaperman, and politician
 Clara Tschudi (1856–1945) a Norwegian writer; lived in Gausdal
 Hans Aanrud (1863–1953) a writer of plays, poetry and stories of rural life in Gudbrandsdalen; raised in Auggedalen
 Inge Krokann (1893 – 1962 in Gausdal) a writer who wrote idiosyncratic nynorsk works
 Carl Gustav Sparre Olsen (1903–1984) a violinist and composer of Norwegian folk tunes; lived in Gausdal 1947-1966
 Magne Elvestrand (1914 in Østre Gausdal – 1991) a pianist, harpsichordist and organist
 Else Kveine, (Norwegian Wiki) (1933 in Gausdal - 2013) a Norwegian poet

Sport 
 Christen Smed, (Norwegian Wiki) (1797 in Gausdal - 1846) mountaineer, climbed Romsdalshornet
 Mattis Stenshagen (born 1996 in Follebu) a Norwegian cross-country skier

Sister cities
Gausdal has sister city agreements with the following places:
  – Mora, Dalarna County, Sweden

References

External links

Municipal fact sheet from Statistics Norway 

Tourist information
Gausdølen - local newspaper 
Art of the States: Bright Days of Little Sunlight musical work inspired by the mountains near Gausdal

 
Municipalities of Innlandet
Valleys of Innlandet
1838 establishments in Norway
1879 disestablishments in Norway
1962 establishments in Norway